Ram Sarup is an Indian wrestler. He competed in the men's freestyle featherweight at the 1956 Summer Olympics.

References

External links
 

1936 births
Living people
Indian male sport wrestlers
Olympic wrestlers of India
Wrestlers at the 1956 Summer Olympics
Place of birth missing (living people)